Thomas Hunter (born 3 February 1991) is an Australian rules football coach who coached Richmond in the AFL Women's competition (AFLW) in their debut season in 2020.

Playing career
Hunter was rookie-listed by Collingwood from 2010 to 2011 before retiring aged 20 due to a spinal condition.

Coaching career
In June 2019, Hunter was official appointed the inaugural coach of Richmond in the AFL Women's competition. In May 2020, Richmond decided not to renew Hunter's contract.

References

External links 

Tom Hunter's player profile at Footywire

Living people
Australian rules footballers from Victoria (Australia)
1991 births